Dr Ratnappa Bharamappa Kumbhar ( September 15, 1909  – 23 December 1998), also called Deshbhakt Ratnappa Kumbhar, was an Indian independence activist from Ichalkaranji, who actively participated in the Indian independence movement. He was one of the persons to sign the Final Draft of the Constitution of India along with B. R. Ambedkar. He received Padma Shri award in 1985 (social work). He was Member of the Parliament, Member of Legislative Council and also worked as a Minister of Food and Civil Supplies in Maharashtra Government.

Biography 
Dr. Ratnappa Kumbhar was born into a Lingayat potter family at Nimshirgaon village in Shirol tehsil.

Indian independence movement 
During his youth he was keenly interested in political and social work and mobilized support under the Prajaparishad banner against the local princely state rulers with  Madhavrao Bagal and other associates like Dinakara Desai He and Desai were arrested on 8 July 1939. Kumbhar, Bagal, Desai and others were arrested and fined by Kolhapur State He actively participated in the freedom movement and later went underground for about 6 years. He was on the forefront of an agitation for dissolution of princely states. He was also elected as a member of the Constituent Assembly of India. For his long devotion to the independence movement, he was called Deshbhakt ("Patriot") Ratnappa Kumbhar.

Political career 
After Independence, Kumbhar was elected to the 1st Lok Sabha from the Kolhapur cum Satara constituency. He was responsible for founding a sugar mill in Ichalkaranji.

Between 1962 and 1982 and from 1990 till his death in 1998, he was a member of the Maharashtra Legislative Assembly representing the Shirol constituency. From 1974 until 1978 he was Minister  of State for home and civil supplies. He was instrumental in bringing about the industrial and agricultural prosperity of Shirol and Hatkanangle tehsil of Kolhapur.

Co-operative Movement
Ratnappa Kumbhar, undertook various Co-operative Movements and also ran them successfully, including :
 Panchaganga Sahakari Sakhar Karkhana Ltd. Ganganagar Ichalkaranji. 
 Peoples Co-operative Bank Ltd.
 The Kolhapur Zilla Sahakari Shetakari Vinkari Soot Girani Ltd
 The Janata Central co-operative consumer stores Ltd.

Ratnappa Kumbhar died in the morning of 23 December 1998, at the age of 89. The Deshbhakt Ratnappa Kumbhar College of Commerce college in Kolhapur is named after him. In Kamptee district Nagpur of Maharashtra Mr. Ramdas Khopey established a school name Deshbhakta Ratnappa Kumbhar Vidyalaya.

References

Indian civil rights activists
Indian socialists
1909 births
1998 deaths
Recipients of the Padma Shri in social work
People from Ichalkaranji
Indian independence activists from Maharashtra
Members of the Constituent Assembly of India
Maharashtra MLAs 1962–1967
Maharashtra MLAs 1967–1972
Maharashtra MLAs 1972–1978
Maharashtra MLAs 1978–1980
Maharashtra MLAs 1990–1995
State cabinet ministers of Maharashtra
Maharashtra MLAs 1980–1985
Indian National Congress politicians from Maharashtra
Prisoners and detainees of British India
India MPs 1952–1957
Marathi politicians
Social workers
20th-century Indian educators
Lok Sabha members from Maharashtra
People from Kolhapur district
Social workers from Maharashtra